Estadio Heraclio Tapia is a multi-purpose stadium in Huánuco, Peru.  It is used by football teams León de Huánuco, & Alianza Universidad.  The stadium can hold 25,000 people.

See also 
 Huánuco
 Copa Perú

Heraclio Tapia
Sport in Huánuco Region
Heraclio Tapia
Buildings and structures in Huánuco Region
Alianza Universidad